
Tomaszów County is a county in Łódź Voivodeship, central Poland. It came into being on January 1, 1999, as a result of the Polish local government reforms passed in 1998.

As of 2006 its total population is 120,973, out of which the population of Tomaszów Mazowiecki is 66,705 and the rural population is 54,268.

Neighbouring counties
Tomaszów County is bordered by Brzeziny County, Skierniewice County and Rawa County to the north, Grójec County and Przysucha County to the east, Opoczno County to the south-east, Piotrków County to the west, and Łódź East County to the north-west.

Administrative division
The county is subdivided into 11 gminas (one urban and 10 rural). These are listed in the following table, in descending order of population.

References

Polish official population figures 2006

 
Land counties of Łódź Voivodeship